The 1994–95 Washington Huskies men's basketball team represented the University of Washington for the 1994–95 NCAA Division I men's basketball season. Led by second-year head coach Bob Bender, the Huskies were members of the Pacific-10 Conference and played their home games on campus at Hec Edmundson Pavilion in Seattle, Washington.

California  later forfeited its wins, which improved Washington's record to 10–17 and 6–12, tied for seventh in the Pac-10. There was no conference tournament this season; last played in 1990. It resumed in 2002.

This season's Final Four was held in Seattle at the Kingdome.

References

External links
Sports Reference – Washington Huskies: 1994–95 basketball season

Washington Huskies men's basketball seasons
Washington Huskies
Washington
Washington